Wassand is a hamlet in the East Riding of Yorkshire, England.

It forms part of the civil parish of Seaton.

Wassand Hall is a large Regency house overlooking Hornsea Mere. The hall was designated a Grade II* listed building in March 1952 and is now recorded in the National Heritage List for England, maintained by Historic England.

Wassand was served from 1865 to 1953 by Wassand railway station on the Hull and Hornsea Railway.

References

External links

Villages in the East Riding of Yorkshire
Holderness